Allee is a given name and surname. Notable people with the name include:

Given name
Allee Willis (1947–2019), American songwriter

Surname
 Alfred Allee aka Alfred Y. Allee (1855–1896), American sheriff
 Alfred Young Allee (1905–1987), American sheriff
 David Allee (born 1969), American photographer
 J. Frank Allee (1857–1938), American merchant and politician
 Verna Allee (born 1949), American business consultant
 Warder Clyde Allee (1885–1955), American ecologist, discoverer of the Allee effect
 William Allee (1852–1916), American politician, Missouri senator

Ecology
Allee effect discovered by and named for Warder Clyde Allee

See also
Ally (name), given name and surname
Allie, given name and surname